Jan Öjlers was a dansband from Sweden. The band scored several Svensktoppen hits.

Svensktoppen songs
"Natten har tusen ögon - 1968
Bara dig vill jag ha - 1969
En skön liten sång - 1971
Lycka till med nästa kille - 1973
Maria dansar - 1978

References 

Dansbands
Swedish musical groups